Paradores in Puerto Rico is a brand of small inns similar to bed and breakfasts that have government permission to call themselves  based on a set of criteria. These inns are scattered across the island countryside, outside the main metropolitan area of San Juan. Often called "country inns" in English,  in Puerto Rico are known for their hospitality, affordable rates, exotic locations, and traditional Puerto Rican cuisine. They are frequented by guests looking to enjoy the local customs and charm.

History

Traditionally, a parador in Spain and other Spanish-speaking countries was a establishment where travelers could seek lodging, and usually, food and drink, similar to an inn. In Spain since 1928, a parador is a state-owned luxury hotel, usually located in a converted historic building such as a monastery or castle, or in a modern building with a panoramic view of a historic and monumental city.

The Puerto Rico Tourism Company established the  brand in 1973 under the administration of Governor Luis A. Ferre, who wanted to enhance the tourism sector of the island. The company runs an enterprise known by the same name, which are typically small, one-of-a-kind, locally owned and operated hotels located in rural areas throughout the island commonwealth.

The inns work with FEMA to provide temporary residence when a major emergency, such as a hurricane or earthquake, displaces people in Puerto Rico.

Participation

This program assures a certain level of quality in the service, cuisine and other aspects of a tourist's stay.
Currently there are 13 of these inns in Puerto Rico, with the biggest concentration around the west coast of the island. In 2018, the brand announced they had invested more than a million dollars in renovations. During the 2019 Easter spring holiday, some inns reported 100% occupancy rates, thanks also in part to local tourism.

Current paradores

The following are the paradores that were operational as of 2019:
 Boquemar in Boquerón, Cabo Rojo
 Combate Beach Resort (Playa El Combate) in Cabo Rojo
 Costa del Mar in Yabucoa
 El Buen Café in Hatillo 
 El Faro in Aguadilla 
 Guánica 1929 in Guánica
 Mauna Caribe in Maunabo
 Palmas de Lucía in Yabucoa
 Turtle Bay Inn in La Parguera, Lajas
 Villas del Mar Hau in Isabela 
 Villa Parguera in La Parguera, Lajas
 Villas Sotomayor in Adjuntas
 Yunque Mar in Luquillo

Past paradores
In 2003, there were 23 paradores. Some of the paradores that were on the list then include:
 Parador Oasis in San Germán
 Parador El Guajataca in Quebradillas

See also

 Tourism in Puerto Rico
 List of hotels in Puerto Rico

References

External links
 

Hotels in Puerto Rico
1973 establishments in Puerto Rico